Folkungagatan is a major thoroughfare and business street located at Södermalm in Stockholm, Sweden. The street runs between Söderledstunneln and Danviksbro. The street was named in 1885 and refers to the medieval House of Folkung.

SoFo (short for "South of Folkungagatan") is an area located to the south of the street.

See also
SoFo

References

External links
 

1885 establishments in Sweden
Streets in Stockholm